Cole County may refer to:

Cole County, Missouri
Cole County, Dakota, the original name of Union County, South Dakota